José Pedro Marques de Freitas (born 10 December 1981 in Porto), commonly known as Zé Pedro, is a Portuguese former professional footballer who played as a midfielder.

References

External links

1981 births
Living people
Footballers from Porto
Portuguese footballers
Association football midfielders
Liga Portugal 2 players
Segunda Divisão players
Varzim S.C. players
F.C. Felgueiras players
S.C. Braga B players
U.D. Oliveirense players
Gondomar S.C. players
C.D. Feirense players